5D/Brorsen (also known as Brorsen's Comet or Comet Brorsen) was a periodic Jupiter-family comet discovered on February 26, 1846, by Danish astronomer Theodor Brorsen. The perihelion of 5D/Brorsen was February 25, just a day before its discovery, and it passed closest to Earth on March 27, at a distance of 0.52 AU. As a result of this close encounter to Earth the comet's coma diameter increased. Johann Friedrich Julius Schmidt estimated it as 3 to 4 arcminutes across on March 9, and 8 to 10 arcminutes across on the 22nd of that same month. On April 22, it was about 20 degrees from the north celestial pole. By the end of this first apparition the orbital period was calculated as 5.5 years. It was discovered that a close approach to Jupiter in 1842 put it in its discovery orbit.

The comet's 5.5-year period would mean that apparitions would alternate between good and poor. As expected, the comet was missed in its 1851 apparition, when it only came as close as 1.5 AU to Earth.

The comet's orbit was still relatively uncertain, made worse by its approach to Jupiter in 1854. Karl Christian Bruhns found a comet on 18 March 1857. Soon an orbit was computed and it was found to be 5D/Brorsen, although predictions were three months off. The comet was followed until June 1857, and the orbit was then well established. Observers reported that the comet had a bright, almost star-like nucleus.

The comet was missed in 1862, and the next recovery was in 1868. A close approach to Jupiter shortened the period enough to make the comet visible in 1873. A very favorable apparition followed in 1879, allowing the comet to be observed for the longest time to date – four months. The comet was missed in 1884, due to observing circumstances, but was also missed in 1890, a favorable apparition. The next favorable apparition occurred in 1901, but searches did not locate the comet.

The next serious search was started by Brian G. Marsden in 1963, who believed the comet had faded out of existence, but computed the orbit for a very favorable 1973 apparition. Japanese observers made intensive searches for the comet, but nothing turned up. This failure to locate the comet, in conjunction with earlier attempts, lead Marsden to conclude that the comet was lost.

References 

  Orbital data taken from this preprint: Neslusan, Lubos: "The identification of asteroid 1996 SK with the extinct nucleus of comet 5D/Brorsen", Memorie della Società Astronomica Italiana, Spec. Vol.: Proc. Internat. Conf. held at Palermo, Italy, June 11–16, 2001 (Postscript version)

External links 
 5D at Gary W. Kronk's Cometography

0005
Periodic comets
Lost comets
005D
005D
18460226